Marion County Regional Airport  is a county-owned public-use airport in Marion County, Arkansas, United States. It is located one nautical mile (2 km) north of the central business district of Flippin, Arkansas.

This airport is included in the FAA's National Plan of Integrated Airport Systems for 2011–2015, which categorized it as a general aviation airport.

Facilities and aircraft 
Marion County Regional Airport covers an area of 80 acres (32 ha) at an elevation of 719 feet (219 m) above mean sea level. It has one runway designated 4/22 with an asphalt surface measuring 5,000 by 75 feet (1,524 x 23 m).

For the 12-month period ending April 30, 2011, the airport had 14,800 aircraft operations, an average of 40 per day: 92% general aviation, 7% air taxi, and 1% military. At that time there were 23 aircraft based at this airport: 70% single-engine, 26% multi-engine, and 4% ultralight.

References

External links 
 Marion County Regional Airport (FLP) at Arkansas Department of Aeronautics
 Aerial image as of 28 February 2001 from USGS The National Map
 

Airports in Arkansas
Transportation in Marion County, Arkansas
Buildings and structures in Marion County, Arkansas